("Motorsports Software Technical Office") is a Yokohama-based video game developer and publisher founded on May 28, 1996. The company is mostly known for the GT series of racing games that it has released (GT Advance Championship Racing, GT Pro Series) and the more recent pet games such as Dogz and Catz.

Games developed

Cancelled games
ActiveDogs

Games published

References

Video game companies of Japan
Video game development companies
Video game companies established in 1996
Japanese companies established in 1996
Companies based in Yokohama